Natasha Spender, Lady Spender (née  Litvin; 18 April 1919 – 21 October 2010) was an English pianist and author. She was the second wife of the writer Sir Stephen Spender.

She was born in London. Her maternal family emigrated to Britain as Jewish refugees from Lithuania. Her mother, Rachel, learned English after the family settled in Glasgow, and later became an actress at the Old Vic. Her father, who was married to another woman, was the music critic, Edwin Evans.

At age 16, Litvin won a scholarship to the Royal College of Music and studied with Clifford Curzon and Arthur Benjamin. After the Second World War, she gave a concert at the former Bergen-Belsen concentration camp to inmates who were recovering in its hospital wing. She was the soloist in the world's first televised concert for the BBC, the last night of The Proms on 13 September 1947 from the Royal Albert Hall.

She first met Stephen Spender in 1940, marrying him in 1941, and the couple were for many years part of a literary circle which included W. H. Auden, Christopher Isherwood, T. S. Eliot and Sir Isaiah Berlin. They divided their time between their homes in St John's Wood and Mas St Jerome in Provence.

In her forties she was forced to give up the piano because of breast cancer, which affected her arm muscles, but she quickly re-established herself as an academic specialising in the psychology of music, and contributed to the Grove Dictionary of Music and Musicians. A collection of writings, about her late husband and her passion for gardening, An English Garden in Provence, appeared in 2004.

Lady Spender died on 21 October 2010 at the age of 91. An archive of her papers is held at the Bodleian Library

She had two children with Stephen Spender: their daughter Elizabeth "Lizzie" Spender, previously an actor, is married to the Australian actor and satirist Barry Humphries, and their son Matthew Spender is married to the daughter of the Armenian-born artist Arshile Gorky.

References

1919 births
2010 deaths
Alumni of the Royal College of Music
Jewish classical pianists
English classical pianists
English women pianists
English Jews
English writers about music
Wives of knights
Musicians from London
20th-century classical pianists
20th-century English musicians
20th-century English women musicians
British people of Lithuanian-Jewish descent
20th-century women pianists